This article is a list of things named after the engineer and inventor Nikola Tesla.

Science and engineering
 Tesla coil
 Singing Tesla coil 
 Tesla's Egg of Columbus
 Tesla Experimental Station
 Tesla's oscillator
 Tesla tower
 Tesla turbine
 Tesla (unit), an SI-derived unit for magnetic inductivity
 Tesla valve

Astronomical bodies
 Tesla, a 26 kilometer-wide crater on the far side of the moon
 2244 Tesla, a minor planet

Other

Awards
 The Nikola Tesla Award
 Nikola Tesla Satellite Award

Biographical works
 My Inventions: The Autobiography of Nikola Tesla
 Prodigal Genius: The Life of Nikola Tesla
Tesla - Lightning in His Hand
 The Inventions, Researches, and Writings of Nikola Tesla
 The Secret of Nikola Tesla

Enterprises and organizations
 Tesla, an electrotechnical conglomerate in former Czechoslovakia
 Tesla, Inc, an American electric car manufacturer
 Nikola Motor Company, an American hybrid truck design company
 Ericsson Nikola Tesla, Croatian affiliate of the Swedish telecommunications equipment manufacturer Ericsson
Nikola Tesla Museum
 Tesla Electric Light and Manufacturing
 Societies:
Tesla Memorial Society (founded 1979), originally Lackawanna, New York, currently Ridgwood, Queens, New York
International Tesla Society (founded 1984), Colorado Springs
 Udruženje za razvoj nauke Nikola Tesla, Novi Sad, Serbia
 Zavičajno udruženje Krajišnika Nikola Tesla, Plandište, Serbia
 Tesla Bank, Zagreb, Croatia

Holidays and events
 National Day of Science in Serbia, July 10
Nikola Tesla Day in Croatia, 10 July
 Day of Nikola Tesla, Association of Teachers in Vojvodina, 4–10 July.
 Day of Nikola Tesla, Niagara Falls, 10 July.
 Nikola Tesla annual electric vehicle rally in Croatia

Music
See: Nikola Tesla in popular culture

Places

 Nikola Tesla Memorial Center in Smiljan
 Belgrade Nikola Tesla Airport
 Nikola Tesla Museum Archive in Belgrade
 TPP Nikola Tesla, the largest power plant in Serbia
 128 streets in Croatia had been named after Nikola Tesla as of November 2008, making him the eighth most common street name origin in the country.
 Tesla Terrace, Madison, Wisconsin USA, the block running from North Rosa Road to North Kenosha Drive on the west side of Madison was long misspelled Telsa Terrace due to a sign-painting error in the 1940s or 1950s. The street's name was corrected to Tesla Terrace in 1987, after a class of Michigan third-graders mounted a letter-writing campaign in support of the change.

Schools
Tesla STEM High School created in 2012 in Redmond, Washington as a choice school with a focus on STEM subjects. The name was chosen by a student vote.

See also
 Tesla (microarchitecture)
 Nvidia Tesla
 Nikola Tesla in popular culture

References

Tesla